Amares is a municipality in Braga District, Portugal. The population in 2011 was 18,889, in an area of 81.95 km².

The present Mayor is Manuel Moreira, elected by the Social Democratic Party. The municipal holiday is June 13.

Demographics

Parishes

The municipality is subdivided into the following parishes:

 Amares e Figueiredo
 Barreiros
 Bico
 Caires
 Caldelas, Sequeiros e Paranhos
 Carrazedo
 Dornelas
 Ferreiros, Prozelo e Besteiros
 Fiscal
 Goães
 Lago
 Rendufe
 Santa Maria do Bouro
 Santa Marta do Bouro
 Torre e Portela
 Vilela, Seramil e Paredes Secas

Notable people 
 Gualdim Pais (1118 – 1195) - a crusader, Knight Templar for Afonso Henriques of Portugal. He founded of the city of Tomar.
 António Variações (1944-1984) - a Portuguese singer and songwriter.
 Jorge Pires (born 1981) - a former professional footballer with 530 club caps

References

 
Municipalities of Portugal